First Day may refer to:

 The first day of the week
 The first day of the Gregorian calendar, January 1, also known as New Year's Day
 First day of issue, the first day a postcard, postage stamp or stamped envelope is officially put up for sale
 the first day of the Genesis creation narrative (Old Testament of the Bible)

In entertainment:
 "First Day" (Timo Maas song), 2005
 "First Day" (The Futureheads song), 2003
 First Day, a 2020 Australian children's television series
 "First Day" (The Inbetweeners), the first episode of the E4 sitcom The Inbetweeners